Alfred Palmer (1852-cir 1936) was a member of the Palmer family, proprietors of the Huntley & Palmers biscuit manufacturers of Reading in England.

He was born in Reading, the son of George Palmer and his wife, Elizabeth Sarah, the daughter of Robert Meteyard. Palmer spent over fifty years working for the Huntley & Palmers biscuit company, chiefly as the head of the engineering department where he was responsible for the building and maintenance of the biscuit machinery. Besides his business involvement, Palmer was a significant benefactor of the University of Reading, and held the position in 1905 of High Sheriff of Berkshire. His country estate was at Wokefield Park in Stratfield Mortimer.

References

1852 births
1936 deaths
People from Reading, Berkshire
People from West Berkshire District
High Sheriffs of Berkshire
English businesspeople